Transitio AB is a Swedish limited liability company that is owned by its customers (Transitio is owned by 20 regions and public transportation authorities.), a mix of different regions and public transport companies in Sweden. Their function is to buy trains and then lease them out to the owners and in so doing reduce the cost of maintenance and ownership. Unlike buses (where the traffic operators operate and purchase vehicles) the public transport companies typically need to lease trains, because they have high cost and usually two-three years of delivery time. There is a need to limit cost by reducing the number of train models and procuring larger number of trains per purchase. Transitio has during the period 1999-2012 purchased trains worth 25 billion SEK (multiple the amount SJ has spent), mainly from the manufacturers Bombardier and Alstom. From 2015 purchase contracts has to a high degree been signed with Stadler Rail. As of 2017, Transitio owned 145 trains.

Train Types Owned 
Stadler Dosto 53 Units
ASEA X11/X14 25 X11 and 5 X14 Units
Alstom Coradia 12 Units
Bombardier Itino 13 Units
Bombardier Contessa 24 Units
Bombardier Regina 63 Units

Owners
Region Jämtland Härjedalen
Region Västerbotten
Regionala kollektivtrafikmyndigheten i Norrbotten
Region Värmland
Region sörmland
Region Skåne
Region Dalarna
Region Västra Götaland
Region Blekinge
Din Tur
Region Örebro Län
Region Uppsala
Region Västmanland
Region Östergötland
Region Kronoberg
Region Jönköping
Region Kalmar
Region Stockholm
Region Gävleborg
Region Halland
Region Kronoberg
Region Jönköpings Län
Region Kalmar Län

References

External links
 Transitio AB homepage
 Våra 145 tåg (list of trains)

Public transport companies in Sweden
Rolling stock leasing companies
Companies based in Stockholm